Edward Peterson may refer to:
 Edward N. Peterson, American historian and professor
 Ed Peterson, American basketball player.